Love Ballad may refer to:

 "Love Ballad" (L.T.D. song), 1976, covered by several performers
 "Love Ballad" (Tove Lo song), 2012
 "Love Ballad", a song by Brown Eyed Soul
 "A Love Ballad", a song by Bo Burnham from Bo Burnham
 Ballad, a form of verse, often a narrative set to music
 Love song, a song about falling or being in love

See also 
 Ballad (disambiguation)
 Love Song (disambiguation)
 Song of Love (disambiguation)